Currencies that issue banknotes in 2,000 denominations

Fifth series of the New Taiwan Dollar banknote
Cape Verdean escudo
Chilean peso
Colombian peso
Dominican peso
Uruguayan peso